Sir Alan Geoffrey Wilson  FAcSS (born 8 January 1939) is a British mathematician and social scientist, former Vice-Chancellor of the University of Leeds and a professor at University College London.

Early life and education
Wilson was born in Bradford on 8 January 1939, and educated at Queen Elizabeth Grammar School, Darlington and the University of Cambridge where he was an undergraduate student of Corpus Christi College, Cambridge and studied the Mathematical Tripos, graduating in 1960.

Career and research
Wilson converted in the 1960s from theoretical physics to the social sciences through research on the mathematical modelling of cities (working in Oxford and London). From 1961 to 1964, he was a Scientific Officer in the Theoretical Physics Group at the Rutherford Laboratory; from 1964 to 1966, a Research Officer at the Institute of Economics and Statistics in the University of Oxford; from 1966 to 1968, Head of the Mathematical Advisory Group at the Ministry of Transport; and from 1968 to 1970, Assistant Director of the Centre for Environmental Studies in London. He was appointed Professor of Urban and Regional Geography at the University of Leeds in 1970, Pro-Vice-Chancellor in 1989 and was Vice Chancellor from 1991. He was elected a Fellow of the British Academy in 1994, and was knighted in 2001.

Sir Alan retired in May 2004 after 13 years as Vice-Chancellor. During his time the University underwent unprecedented growth and transformation. Student numbers increased from 12,000 to 31,500, turnover increased from £100m to £320m and research income increased by more than 400% to £71m.

His knowledge of the university sector led to his appointment as first Director General for Higher Education by the UK Government at the Department for Education and Skills, a post which he took up part-time in February 2004 and full-time on 1 June 2004 until 2007. In this role, he was a key adviser to secretaries of state Charles Clarke, Ruth Kelly and Alan Johnson, and played a critical role in the government's drive to widen participation in higher education and maintaining a world-class education system.

In May 2006 he was appointed Master of Corpus Christi College, Cambridge, and took up the post in October. He resigned from the post of Master of Corpus Christi on 1 May 2007, after only seven months in post.

In September, 2007, he joined University College London to serve as Professor of Urban and Regional Systems at the Centre for Advanced Spatial Analysis He was the Chairman of the Arts and Humanities Research Council (AHRC) from 2007-2013.
Since 2013, he has been Chair of the Home Office Science Advisory Council and Chair of the Lead Expert Group of the Government Office for Science Foresight project on the Future of Cities.

In 2016, he was appointed as Interim CEO of the Alan Turing Institute before becoming director of special projects when Adrian Smith took over. He retired as executive chair of the Ada Lovelace Institute in February 2020, having overseen the organisation's development phase, and was succeeded by Dame Wendy Hall.

Publications
 Entropy in urban and regional modelling. London: Pion, 1970. 166 p. / Russ. ed.: Вильсон А. Дж. Энтропийные методы моделирования сложных систем. – М., Наука, 1978. 248 с.

Awards and honours
Wilson was elected a Fellow of the Royal Society (FRS) in 2006. He was awarded the Laureat d’Honneur by the International Geographical Union and the 2004 Prize in Regional Science by the European Regional Science Association.

Personal life
Wilson's wife's name is Sarah.

References

 
 

1939 births
Living people
Scientists from Bradford
20th-century British mathematicians
21st-century British mathematicians
Alumni of Corpus Christi College, Cambridge
British social scientists
English geographers
Fellows of the Academy of Social Sciences
Fellows of the British Academy
Fellows of Corpus Christi College, Cambridge
Fellows of the Royal Society
Members of Academia Europaea
Academics of the University of Leeds
Vice-Chancellors of the University of Leeds
Masters of Corpus Christi College, Cambridge
Presidents of the Institute of Physics
Knights Bachelor
Academics of University College London
Fellows of the Royal Geographical Society
Urban geographers
Regional scientists